George Clough Richardson (December 5, 1916 – June 26, 2000) was a Progressive Conservative party member of the House of Commons of Canada. He was a farmer by trade.

He represented Saskatchewan's Humboldt—Lake Centre electoral district which he won in the 1979 federal election. After serving his only term, the 31st Canadian Parliament, he was defeated in the 1980 federal election by Vic Althouse of the New Democratic Party.

Richardson made two previous unsuccessful attempts to enter Parliament in the 1972 and 1974 federal elections at Regina—Lake Centre electoral district. He died in Saskatoon in 2000.

References

External links
 

1916 births
2000 deaths
Members of the House of Commons of Canada from Saskatchewan
Progressive Conservative Party of Canada MPs